Pleasant Hill is an unincorporated community in Saline County, Arkansas, United States. The Pleasant Hill Methodist Church, which is listed on the National Register of Historic Places, is located in Pleasant Hill. Pleasant Hill was established before the Civil War as an agricultural community. The church has historically served as a community center and hosts a community reunion on the third Sunday of July each year.

References

Unincorporated communities in Saline County, Arkansas
Unincorporated communities in Arkansas